The Ghost of Blackwood Hall is the twenty-fifth volume in the Nancy Drew Mystery Stories series. It was first published in 1948 under the pseudonym Carolyn Keene.  The actual author was ghostwriter Mildred Wirt Benson.

Plot summary
Nancy Drew's jeweler's customer Mrs. Putney asks Nancy and her friends to help recover her stolen jewels. The search for the thieves takes Nancy, Bess, and George to New Orleans. Mrs. Putney's odd behavior and two young women involve Nancy in a case involving a cruel hoax being perpetrated at the abandoned Blackwood Hall.  Nancy's father, Carson Drew, also helps solve this mystery by contacting his workers, and helping him find the man that is connected to this mysterious affair.

References

External links
 

1948 American novels
1948 children's books
Children's mystery novels
Grosset & Dunlap books
Nancy Drew books
Novels set in New Orleans